A Victory garden is a private garden planted in the British Empire and United States during World War I and World War II

Victory Garden may refer to:

Gardens
 Victory Garden, Macau, a park
 Victory Gardens, New Jersey, United States
 Victory Gardens Theater, a Chicago theater
 Victory Gardens, Renfrewshire, a location in the UK

Other
 Victory Garden (novel), a work of electronic literature by Stuart Moulthrop
 The Victory Garden (comics), a comic–book story starring Donald Duck
 The Victory Garden (TV series), an American show about gardening
 Victory Gardens, a 1991 album by John & Mary